The Patrick Slowey House is a historic house in Cambridge, Massachusetts, United States. It is a 1½ story wood-frame structure, set on a high brick basement. The front facade is three bays wide, with a center entrance sheltered by a modest Italianate hood and accessed by a side-facing stair. The house was built in 1852 for Patrick Slowey, a laborer, and retains original elements, including its clapboard siding. It is one of the best-preserved workers' houses in northwestern Cambridge.

The building was added to the National Register of Historic Places in 1982, where it is listed at 73 Bolton Street.

See also
National Register of Historic Places listings in Cambridge, Massachusetts

References

Houses completed in 1852
Houses on the National Register of Historic Places in Cambridge, Massachusetts